The Ohai Railway Board (ORB) was a short railway in Southland, New Zealand. The railway line itself still exists as the Ohai branch line, but the ORB was dissolved in 1990, and in 1992 the Southland District Council sold the board's assets to New Zealand Rail Limited.

History

Construction 
In the 1870s, coal was discovered in Ohai. Mines opened in the area, mostly with own 2 ft gauge railways to carry coal.

Coal production boomed in the area in 1882 when a private spur railway line was built by the Nightcaps Coal Company from the terminus of the New Zealand Government Railways Wairio Branch at Wairio to Nightcaps to provide more efficient transport of coal.

In 1916 a proposal was made to build another line to coal interests around Ohai. The construction of this line was fiercely opposed by the Nightcaps Coal Company, fearing a loss of business. The Ohai Railway Board (ORB) was formed under the District Railways Act 1877. Much like the Port Chalmers Railway Company Limited in Dunedin, the ORB was formed with the backing of local government, and because the central government declined to extend its line. In the case of the ORB, this was the railway line from Wairio to the new coalfields at Ohai. Local landowners, mainly farmers, funded the extension through mortgages against their own properties. After two Royal Commissions, construction was approved in July 1919 with a deviation through Morley Village, considered part of Nightcaps.

The first section of the line, including the part serving Morley Village, opened on 1 September 1920. Ohai was reached four years later. The Nightcaps Coal Company ceased to operate, and they handed over their railway line to the Railways Department, who dismantled it in 1926 as the Ohai branch line was capable of catering for traffic from Nightcaps. In 1932, Parliament passed a local enactment for the ORB, the Ohai Railway Board Act 1932.

In 1934, this line was further extended beyond Ohai to Birchwood, but the terminus was reverted to Reeds in 1956, with a brief reopening of the line from Reeds to Morely in 1960, before the terminus again reverted to Ohai.

Demise 
Economic reform in the 1980s ultimately led to the demise of the ORB. One of the ORB's members, the State Mines Department, became Coal Corporation on 1 April 1987. According to one source, the Coal Corporation and the New Zealand Railways Corporation (NZR) "put pressure" on the ORB to amalgamate with NZR. Following the 1989 local government reforms the Wallace County Council was amalgamated into the Southland County Council, forming the Southland District Council. The District Council took over running of the ORB from 1989, and the ORB's operations were incorporated into the national rail network on 1 June 1990, and from then on the New Zealand Railways Corporation operated trains on the line.

In 1992 the Southland District Council sold the ORB to New Zealand Rail Limited, (the rail and ferry operations of the Railways Corporation, which was split off from the corporation in 1991) who paid $1.2 million for the line and other assets of the ORB. The proceeds of this sale were used to form the Ohai Railway Board Trust, which grants money to local projects.

The line still serves coal trains between Invercargill and Nightcaps. The line is now called the Ohai Line, and it is one of the very few survivors of a formerly extensive rural branch line network.

Board membership
The 1932 Ohai Railway Board Act defined the membership of the ORB as:

 the District Manager of State Coal Mines at Ohai, who shall be Chairman of the Board:
 the member of the Wallace County Council representing the Wairaki Riding of that county:
 the member of the Wallace County Council representing the Wairio Riding of that county:
 the President of the Nightcaps District Miners' Union.

Locomotives

NZR steam locomotives

NZR diesel locomotives

Industrial steam locomotives
Only one industrial steam loco was built and operated for the ORB.

Industrial diesel locomotives
All of these locos were originally built for the ORB, but were later either sold to other industrial users, or placed into preservation straight away.

Preservation 
The Ohai Railway Board was closely associated with the railway preservation movement.  It donated its steam locomotives X 442 and WAB 794 to the New Zealand Railway and Locomotive Society in 1968 and they are leased to the Feilding and District Steam Rail Society for restoration.  WAB 794 is currently in mainline operating condition and hauls heritage passenger trains in the North Island from its Feilding depot, and has been hauling Tranz Scenic's Overlander express on "Steam Engine Saturdays" and "Steam Engine Sundays".  The Ohai Railway Board Heritage Trust, an organisation with no connection with the Ohai Railway Board, was set up to preserve facilities in Wairio and restore a number of steam locomotives of the P and V classes, but has been dissolved.  The engines were recovered from being dumped by a river in Branxholme, formerly on the Kingston Branch town and now on the Ohai Line.

See also 
 Ohai Railway Board Heritage Trust 
 Wairio Branch

Footnotes

Notes

References

External links 
 Ohai Railway Board Act 1932

Locomotives of New Zealand
Rail transport in Southland, New Zealand